The National Basketball League of Canada's Newcomer of the Year Award is an annual National Basketball League of Canada (NBL) award given since the 2012–13 season. It is earned by the best player who completed his first season in the league. It was first awarded to the London Lightning's Marvin Phillips, who went on to be named Finals Most Valuable Player in 2013. The most recent recipient is Jarius "JR" Holder of the Sudbury Five.

Winners

References 

National Basketball League of Canada awards